Siegfried Roch (born 26 March 1959) is a former West German handball player who competed in the 1984 Summer Olympics.

He was a member of the West German handball team which won the silver medal. He played one match as goalkeeper.

References 
 
 

1959 births
Living people
German male handball players
Handball players at the 1984 Summer Olympics
Olympic handball players of West Germany
Olympic medalists in handball
Medalists at the 1984 Summer Olympics
Olympic silver medalists for West Germany
People from Wunsiedel
Sportspeople from Upper Franconia